Aaron Wilson House is a historic home located at Ovid in Seneca County, New York.  It is a five bay wide, two story, center hall stone dwelling built about 1835 in the Federal style.  Also on the property is a huge, gambrel roofed dairy barn, a machine shed, and frame pumphouse.

It was listed on the National Register of Historic Places in 2001.

References

Houses on the National Register of Historic Places in New York (state)
Federal architecture in New York (state)
Houses completed in 1835
Houses in Seneca County, New York
National Register of Historic Places in Seneca County, New York